Airlift is the act of transporting people or cargo from point to point using aircraft.

Airlift may also refer to:
Airlift (company), a Norwegian helicopter operator
Airlift (dredging device), a suction device for moving sand and silt underwater
Airlift (film), a 2016 film about the evacuation of Indians based in Kuwait, starring Akshay Kumar and Nimrat Kaur
Lift (force), the upwards force generated resulting from the pressure difference when air moves over an airfoil.

See also
Airlift pump, a way of pumping a liquid with the injection of compressed air